The 2014 Oceania Weightlifting Championships took place at the Complexe Sportif de Boulari in Le Mont-Dore, New Caledonia from 28 to 31 May 2014.

Medal summary
Results shown below are for the senior competition only. Junior and youth results are cited here and here respectively.

Medal table

Men

Women

References

External links
Senior results book
Junior results book
Youth results book

Weightlifting competitions
Oceania Weightlifting Championships
Oceania Weightlifting Championships
International weightlifting competitions hosted by New Caledonia
Sports competitions in Nouméa
Oceania Weightlifting Championships